In recorded history, the planet Jupiter has experienced impact events and has been probed and photographed by several spacecraft.

Impact

Spacecraft entry
Galileo spacecraft entry – September 21, 2003
Galileo probe entry – December 7, 1995

Spacecraft orbit
Juno
Galileo

Spacecraft flybys
New Horizons
Cassini-Huygens
Ulysses (twice)
Voyager 2
Voyager 1
Pioneer 11
Pioneer 10

References

Jupiter